Ancholi  is a neighbourhood in the Karachi Central district of Karachi, Pakistan.

There are several ethnic groups including Muhajirs, Sindhis, Gujratis, Kashmiris, Seraikis, Pakhtuns, Balochis, Memons, Bohras Ismailis, etc. Over 99% of the population is Muslim and Majority are Shias. The population of Gulberg Town is estimated to be nearly one million. The town gets its name from the village of Incholi in India.

The other name of Ancholi Society is Sadaat Colony meaning the Colony Of Syeds. In fact Ancholi Society and Sadaat Colony are separated by a road. Ancholi society (excluding Sadat Colony) was founded by Mr. Sharfuddin who for this purpose procured the land from KDA and named it Ancholi Society as he was born in Ancholi, India.

Notable Places

Major Places 

 JDC Foundation Office

 Edhi Welfare Centre
 K-Electric Power House & IBC

Streets 

 Ancholi Main Rd
 Shaheed Foundation St
 Khair-ul-Amal Road
 Al Noor St
 Samanabad St
 Shahrah-e-Umer Farooq St
 Allama Rasheed Turabi St
 JDC Rd
 Abajee St

Parks 

 Bagh-e-Saman Family Park
 Amroha Football Ground(also called Amroha Ground)
 Allama Rasheed Turabi Park
 Eidgah Ground Block 17
 Public Park Block 17
 Ladies Park Block 17
 Khan Ground
 Globe Park Block 19
 Nishan-e-Haider Park
 Imam Ali A.s Park(also called Block 20 Park)

Food & Refreshment Businesses 

 Mazaidar Haleem & Foods
 Super Burger
 Karak Chai Ancholi
 Zain-ul-Abideen Hotel
 BurgerOHolic
 Mr. Mak Fast Food

Schools and Educational Institution 

 Metropolitan Academy Ancholi Campus
 Al Muhammad School System
 Bright Career Public Secondary School
 Ebrahim Ali Bhai Government School
 Umer Grammar School
 Happy Palace Grammar School
 The World Grammar Secondary School
 Mohammadi Public School

Religious Places 

 Bargah Shuhada-e-Karbala
 Bargah Chaharda Masoomeen A.S
 Imam Bargah-e-Fatimah Al Zahra A.S
 Masjid Bab-e-Rehmat
 Madinah Masjid
 Jama Masjid Samanabad
 Jamia Masjid Noor
 Jamia Masjid RIzwan

See also
 Gulberg Town
 Sadat Colony, Ancholi
 Gulistan-e-Jauhar
 Gulshan-e-Iqbal

References

External links 
 Karachi Website.

Neighbourhoods of Karachi
Gulberg Town, Karachi